MyTV was a British television channel which launched on 27 February 2006 as Eat Cinema, originally targeted at mainstream audiences.

The channel was originally a joint venture between multi-platform digital television company Enteraction TV (ETV) and trade body All Industry Marketing for fashion, cinema and publicity. On 3 January 2007, the channel changed its name from Eat Cinema to My Channel. During the months prior to this date, the channel had reduced its cinema related content. Until 27 November 2007, the schedule consisted of three old L!VE TV programmes, Lie Detector, The Why Files and Indecent Proposals. These programmes were repeated daily, with no advertisement breaks and no on-screen channel logo.

On 27 November 2007, the channel was acquired by Record Media Group, all content was changed, and an on-screen channel logo added;  the channel is controlled by Record TV Network, a UK-based operator and licensee of over 150 channels worldwide.

MyTV was available on Sky channel 190. My Channel swapped EPG numbers with 'Channel TBC' on 14 June 2010.

MyTV ceased broadcasting in the UK on 1 January 2021, alongside sister channel Record TV HD.

MyTV Programmes

:

King David
The Chrissy B Show
On Screen
Shift
My Top 10
France 24
Drive It!
Arts.21
Tomorrow Today
Global 3000
In Good Shape
Isaura The Slave
Joseph from Egypt
Moses and the Ten Commandments
My First Home
The Wildlife Docs
The Aviators
Next Stop
Top Million Dollar Agent
Nomads
The Secretary
I Love Her to Death
Mariana and Scarlett
Walk Around Britain
The Fashion Hero
Miracles of Jesus
Esther
Finding Answers

References

External links 
 

English-language television stations in the United Kingdom
Television channels and stations established in 2006
Television channels and stations disestablished in 2021
2006 establishments in the United Kingdom